The 2020 African Boxing Olympic Qualification Tournament for the boxing tournament at the 2020 Summer Olympics in Tokyo, Japan was held in Diamniadio, Senegal from 20 to 29 February 2020.

Medalists

Men

Women

Qualification summary

Results

Men

Flyweight (52 kg)
Seeds

Featherweight (57 kg)
Seeds

Lightweight (63 kg)
Seeds

Welterweight (69 kg)
Seeds

Middleweight (75 kg)
Seeds

Light heavyweight (81 kg)
Seeds

Heavyweight (91 kg)
Seeds

Super heavyweight (+91 kg)
Seeds

Women

Flyweight (51 kg)
Seeds

Featherweight (57 kg)
Seeds

Lightweight (60 kg)
Seeds

Welterweight (69 kg)
Seeds

Middleweight (75 kg)
Seeds

References

Boxing Olympic Qualification Africa
Boxing qualification for the 2020 Summer Olympics
African Boxing Olympic Qualification Tournament
African Boxing Olympic Qualification Tournament
African Boxing Olympic Qualification Tournament